The PHILIPS 1996 China FA Cup (Chinese: 1996飞利浦中国足球协会杯) was the second edition of Chinese FA Cup. The cup title sponsor was Philips.

Results

First round

First leg

Second leg

Second round

First leg

Second leg

Third round

First leg

Second leg

Semi-finals

First leg

Second leg

Final

References

1996
1996 in Chinese football
1996 domestic association football cups